Eryk Latoń (born 22 August 1993) is a Polish professional racing cyclist, who most recently rode for UCI Continental team, .

Major results

2014
 2nd Overall Dookoła Mazowsza
1st  Sprints classification
1st Stage 6
 8th Memoriał Andrzeja Trochanowskiego
 8th Race Horizon Park 2
2016
 2nd Puchar Ministra Obrony Narodowej
 9th Clásica de Almería
 10th Memorial Grundmanna I Wizowskiego
2017
 2nd Puchar Ministra Obrony Narodowej
 3rd Memoriał Andrzeja Trochanowskiego
 4th Overall Dookoła Mazowsza
2018
 3rd Grand Prix Poland
 4th Overall Belgrade–Banja Luka
 4th Memoriał Romana Siemińskiego

References

External links

1993 births
Living people
Polish male cyclists
People from Kalisz County
Sportspeople from Greater Poland Voivodeship